The 1969–70 SK Rapid Wien season was the 72nd season in club history.

Squad

Squad and statistics

Squad statistics

Fixtures and results

League

Cup

European Cup

References

1969-70 Rapid Wien Season
Rapid